Dimitrie Leonida, formerly known as IMGB is a metro station in southern Bucharest, Romania, on Line 2. The station was originally built in order to transport workers to the Kvaerner IMGB (literally: Heavy Machinery Factory, Bucharest) steelworks. Even though this purpose is still served today to an extent, the area around the steelworks has developed residentially, and therefore is used by commuters who work in the city centre of Bucharest. The station was opened on 24 January 1986 as part of the inaugural section of the line, from Piața Unirii to Depoul IMGB.

The station received its current name in 2009, after the engineer Dimitrie Leonida.

References

Bucharest Metro stations
Railway stations opened in 1986
1986 establishments in Romania